Ioannis Papapetrou (born March 30, 1994) is a Greek professional basketball player  for Partizan of the Serbian KLS, the Adriatic League and the EuroLeague. He is 2.06 m (6 ft 9 in) tall, and he mainly plays at the small forward position.

Early career
Papapetrou, who is considered to be one of the most talented Greek players that was born in the 1994 age class, along with players like Giannis Antetokounmpo and Lefteris Bochoridis, began his basketball playing career with the youth teams of the Ilysiakos club in Athens, Greece. He played for 5 seasons in Greek junior competitions with Ilysiakos. He then spent his junior and senior years of high school, playing basketball at the Florida Air Academy, in Melbourne, Florida.

College career
In 2012, Papapetrou joined the Texas Longhorns men's basketball team of the University of Texas. He played one season of college basketball with the Longhorns and averaged 8.3 points, 4.4 rebounds, and 1.2 assists per game, in 24.3 minutes per game. He played in a total of 34 games in the NCAA.

Professional career

Olympiacos
Papapetrou's professional career began with the Greek League team Olympiacos in 2013, when he signed a 5-year deal with Olympiacos, in late August 2013, which was his first pro deal. The contract was said to be worth $2 million net income. The contract included an NBA buyout option after the contract's third season.

With Olympiacos, he won the Greek League championship in 2015 and 2016. In 2016, he was named the Greek League Best Young Player.

Panathinaikos
On July 8, 2018, Papapetrou declined Olympiacos's renewal proposal, and became a free agent. Two days later, he signed with Olympiacos' arch-rivals, Panathinaikos, on a three-year deal. 

On February 17, 2019, he won his first title with Panathinaikos, after beating PAOK in the 2019 Greek Cup Final, which was held at Heraklion Indoor Sports Arena. Papapetrou had 10 points, 6 rebounds, 2 assists, 2 steals, and 2 blocks in that game. Four months later, Papapetrou was crowned Greek Basket League champion, after Panathinaikos swept Promitheas Patras in the league's finals.

Prior to the 2020–21 season, Papapetrou became the team's captain after the departure of Nick Calathes. He averaged 12.1 points and 4.1 rebounds per game. On July 11, 2021, Papapetrou officially renewed his contract with the Greek club for an additional two years. 

On July 15, 2022, Papapetrou amicably parted ways with Panathinaikos after four seasons.

Partizan
On July 19, 2022, Papapetrou signed a one-year contract with Serbian club Partizan, under coach Željko Obradović.

National team career

Greek junior national team
As a member of the Greek junior national teams, Papapetrou played at the 2009 FIBA Europe Under-16 Championship. He also played at the 2010 FIBA Europe Under-16 Championship, where he averaged 11.4 points, 4.6 rebounds, and 2.3 assists, in 32.1 minutes per game. He also played at the 2013 FIBA Europe Under-20 Championship, where he averaged 15.9 points, 5.3 rebounds, and 1.6 assists, in 33.0 minutes per game.

Greek senior national team
Papapetrou is also a member of the senior men's Greek national basketball team. He was selected to Greece's 12 man roster for the 2016 Turin FIBA World Olympic Qualifying Tournament. He also played at the EuroBasket 2017, and the 2019 FIBA World Cup qualification.

Personal life
Papapetrou's nickname is Papi. His father, Argiris Papapetrou, was also a professional basketball player, who played a decade for Panathinaikos and the Greece national basketball team. His mother, Anastasia, played football in Greece. While his older brother, Georgios Papapetrou, is also a professional basketball player.

Career statistics

EuroLeague

|-
| style="text-align:left;"| 2013–14
| style="text-align:left;" rowspan=5| Olympiacos
| 12 || 6 || 10.3 || .568 || .478 || .400 || 1.4 || .3 || .3 || .2 || 4.6 || 3.7
|-
| style="text-align:left;"| 2014–15
| 11 || 0 || 10.4 || .485 || .400 || .500 || 1.3 || .4 || .4 || .0 || 3.6 || 2.1
|-
| style="text-align:left;"| 2015–16
| 24 || 11 || 19.0 || .432 || .400 || .692 || 2.7 || .7 || .7 || .3 || 5.7 || 4.8
|-
| style="text-align:left;"| 2016–17
| 36 || 6 || 15.9 || .396 || .333 || .688 || 2.6 || .5 || .5 || .3 || 4.4 || 3.8
|-
| style="text-align:left;"| 2017–18
| 31 || 12 || 22.0 || .413 || .286 || .667 || 3.6 || .7 || .4 || .3 || 6.8 || 6.1
|-
| style="text-align:left;"| 2018–19
| style="text-align:left;" rowspan=3|  Panathinaikos
| 28 || 22 || 25.3 || .503 || .333 || .673 || 4.2 || 1.1 || .8 || .5 || 9.0 || 10.4
|-
| style="text-align:left;"| 2019–20
| 27 || 24 || 27.6|| .556 || .367 || .606 || 4.1 || .8 || .7 || .5 || 10.9 || 11.2
|-
| style="text-align:left;"| 2020–21
| 27 || 26 || 30.3 || .403 || .366 || .730 || 4.1 || 2.4 || .6 || .1 || 12.1 || 10.6

College

|-
| style="text-align:left;"| 2012–13
| style="text-align:left;"| Texas
| 34 || 25 || 24.3 || .432 || .359 || .583 || 4.4 || 1.2 || .6 || .7 || 8.3
|- class="sortbottom"
| style="text-align:left;"| Career
| style="text-align:left;"| 
| 34 || 25 || 24.3 || .432 || .359 || .583 || 4.4 || 1.2 || .6 || .7 || 8.3

References

External links
 Ioannis Papapetrou at basket.gr 
 Ioannis Papapetrou at eurobasket.com
 Ioannis Papapetrou at esake.gr 
 Ioannis Papapetrou at fiba.com
 Ioannis Papapetrou at texassports.com

1994 births
Living people
2019 FIBA Basketball World Cup players
Greek Basket League players
Greek expatriate basketball people in Serbia
Greek expatriate basketball people in the United States
Greek men's basketball players
Olympiacos B.C. players
Panathinaikos B.C. players
KK Partizan players
Basketball players from Patras
Small forwards
Texas Longhorns men's basketball players